Do not disturb may refer to:

As an instruction
 "Do not disturb" sign
 Do Not Disturb (telecommunications), a function on most PBX or PABX systems
 Do Not Disturb, a feature of Apple's iOS operating system, accessible via Control Center or Settings on iOS devices

Film and television
Do Not Disturb (1965 film), a film starring Doris Day, directed by Ralph Levy
Do Not Disturb (1999 film), a film starring Jennifer Tilly
Do Not Disturb, a 2003 film starring Ian Tracey
Do Not Disturb (2010 film), a horror-thriller film written and directed by BC Furtney
Do Not Disturb (2012 film), a French comedy film
Do Not Disturb (2013 film), a film by BC Furtney
Do Not Disturb (2014 film), a French film by Patrice Leconte
Do Not Disturb (2016 film), a British television comedy film starring Catherine Tate
Do Not Disturb (TV series), a 2008 American sitcom
"Do Not Disturb" (Fear the Walking Dead), an episode

Music
Do Not Disturb (Jim Verraros album), 2011
Do Not Disturb (Joanne Accom album), 2001
Do Not Disturb (Van der Graaf Generator album), 2016
"Do Not Disturb" (Bananarama song), 1985
"Do Not Disturb" (Drake song), 2017
"Do Not Disturb" (Mahalia song), 2019

Books
Do Not Disturb (book), 2021 non-fiction book by journalist Michela Wrong

See also
Please Do Not Disturb, a 2010 Iranian film
Please Do Not Disturb (album), a 1997 album by Juliana Hatfield
DND (disambiguation)
Do Knot Disturb, a 2009 Bollywood film